Klyuchi is a rural locality (a selo) in Stolbovsky Selsoviet, Kamensky District, Altai Krai, Russia. The population was 63 as of 2013. There are 3 streets.

Geography 
Klyuchi is located 31 km northeast of Kamen-na-Obi (the district's administrative centre) by road. Stolbovo is the nearest rural locality.

References 

Rural localities in Kamensky District, Altai Krai